Todan is a village and municipality in the Goranboy District of Azerbaijan.

References 

Populated places in Goranboy District